Events from the year 1830 in Scotland.

Incumbents

Law officers 
 Lord Advocate – Sir William Rae, Bt until December; then Francis Jeffrey
 Solicitor General for Scotland – John Hope; then Henry Cockburn

Judiciary 
 Lord President of the Court of Session – Lord Granton
 Lord Justice General – The Duke of Montrose
 Lord Justice Clerk – Lord Boyle

Events 
 19 March – the suspension bridge at Montrose partly collapses due to movement of a crowd watching a boat race from it, with the loss of at least 4 lives.
 17 May – meteorite falls on the North Inch at Perth.
 27 May – Rev. Alexander Duff arrives in Calcutta as the Church of Scotland's first missionary to India.
 13 July – Alexander Duff co-founds the General Assembly's Institution, the modern-day Scottish Church College, in Calcutta.
 November – Wellington Suspension Bridge over River Dee at Aberdeen opened to pedestrians.
 16 December – Bridge of Don at Aberdeen opened.
 Twin-hulled iron paddle steamer Lord Dundas built for service on the Forth and Clyde Canal.
 McVitie's founded as McVitie & Price's biscuit bakery in Rose Street, Edinburgh.
 Annandale distillery opened.

Births 
 Early – Andrew Halliday, journalist and playwright (died 1877 in London)
 5 February – Lieutenant General James John McLeod Innes, recipient of the Victoria Cross (died 1907)
 5 March – Charles Wyville Thomson, marine zoologist (died 1882)
 15 March – John Ferguson, politician (died 1906 in Australia)
 5 April
 (probable date) Robert Francis Fairlie, steam locomotive designer (died 1885 in London)
 Alexander Muir, songwriter (died 1906 in Canada)
 16 July – Alexander Carnegie Kirk, mechanical engineer (died 1892)
 3 September – Lewis Campbell, classicist (died 1908 in Switzerland)
 21 September – John Holms, textile mill owner and Liberal politician (died 1891)
 22 October – Arthur John Burns, woollen mill owner and politician in Otago (died 1901 in New Zealand)
 30 October – Eliza Brightwen, naturalist (died 1906 in England)
 John Crawford, sculptor (died 1861)

Deaths 
 14 January – The Right Reverend Daniel Sandford, Bishop of Edinburgh (born 1766, near Dublin)
 20 February – Robert Anderson, literary editor, biographer and critic (born 1750)
 7 April – Henry Bell, engineer who introduced the first successful passenger steamboat service in Europe (born 1767)
 3 July – John Campbell, advocate and politician (born 1798)
 16 December – Sir James Donaldson printer and newspaper publisher, who bequeathed a large part of his estate to the founding of Donaldson's Hospital (born 1751)

The arts
 Thomas Aird publishes his narrative poem The Captive of Fez.
 Sir Walter Scott publishes the plays Auchindrane and The Doom of Devorgoil.
 David Wilkie appointed Principal Painter in Ordinary to King William IV
 Completion of publication of the Edinburgh Encyclopædia, commenced in 1808
 16 December – Felix Mendelssohn completes composition of his concert overture The Hebrides as Die einsame Insel ("The Lonely Island").

See also 

 1830 in the United Kingdom

References 

 
Scotland
1830s in Scotland